Pectinimura crassipalpis is a moth in the family Lecithoceridae. It is found in Loei Province, Thailand. The wingspan is 17 mm. The forewings are mustard brown with a dark fuscous discal spot at the upper corner of the cell. The hindwings are greyish brown.

Etymology
The species name is derived from Latin crassus (meaning thick) and refers to the abnormally thickened second segment of the labial palpus.

References

Moths described in 2008
crassipalpis
Moths of Asia